Animal X may refer to:
Animal X (TV series), an Australian-made documentary television series that aired in more than 120 countries
Animal X (band), a Romanian band, also the name of their first album, released in 2000